Royersford station is a former train station in Royersford, Pennsylvania. It is located on Main Street. It was originally built by the Reading Railroad, and later served the SEPTA diesel service line extending from the Norristown section of the Manayunk/Norristown Line to Pottsville. It was taken out of service in 1981, when SEPTA cancelled the diesel service.

References

External links

Former SEPTA Regional Rail stations
Former Reading Company stations
Railway stations closed in 1981
Former railway stations in Montgomery County, Pennsylvania